Tor Ahlsand (born 22 August 1931) is a retired Norwegian rower. He was born in Aker. Representing the club Bærum RK, he finished ninth in the coxed fours event at the 1964 Summer Olympics. He has later represented Christania RK and won two gold medals  in the World Masters Games.

References

1931 births
Living people
Norwegian male rowers
Olympic rowers of Norway
Rowers at the 1964 Summer Olympics
Rowers from Oslo